The 2022 African Men's Youth Handball Championship was held in Kigali, Rwanda from 30 August to 6 September 2022. It also acted as a qualification tournament for the 2023 Men's Youth World Handball Championship.

Egypt secured the title with a 51–29 win over Rwanda, while Morocco defeated Burundi 41–34 to claim the bronze medal. Burundi and Rwanda thus secured both their first-ever medals as well as their inaugural debut in the Men's Youth World Handball Championship.

Draw
The draw was held on 22 July 2022 at the head office of the African Handball Confederation in Abidjan, Ivory Coast.

Preliminary round
All times are local (UTC+2).

Group A

Group B

Knockout stage

Bracket

Semifinals

Seventh place game

Fifth place game

Third place game

Final

Final standings

References

Men's Youth Handball Championship
African Men's Youth Handball Championship
African Men's Youth Handball Championship
African Men's Youth Handball Championship
Sport in Kigali
Youth
African Men's Youth Handball Championship